Embelia ruminata, also known by the common name bitter leaf, is a species from the genus Embelia.

References

Primulaceae